The German Marshall Fund of the United States (GMF) is a non-partisan American public policy think tank that seeks to promote cooperation and understanding between North America and the European Union.

Founded in 1972 through a gift from the West German government on the 25th anniversary of the Marshall Plan, GMF contributes research and analysis on transatlantic and global issues: convenes policy and business leaders at international conferences; provides exchange opportunities for emerging American and European leaders; and supports initiatives to strengthen democracies. GMF focuses on policy, leadership, and civil society.

GMF is headquartered in Washington, D.C., and has offices in Berlin, Brussels, Ankara, Belgrade, Bucharest, Paris, and Warsaw.

Current programs
Some GMF programs are the Alliance for Securing Democracy, the Brussels Forum, Atlantic Dialogues, Transatlantic Academy, and the Transatlantic Trends Survey.

GMF's policy programs include Asia, the European Union, Europe's East and Russia, Foreign and Security Policy, Energy Security, NATO, Trade and Investment and Urban and Regional Policy. GMF's leadership programs include the Manfred Wörner Seminar, the Marshall Memorial Fellowship, the Transatlantic Inclusion Leaders Network, Marshall Seminar, the Transatlantic Leadership Seminar, the Congress Bundestag Forum and the Young Transatlantic Network.

GMF's civil society projects include the Balkan Trust for Democracy, the Black Sea Trust for Regional Cooperation, and the Fund for Belarus Democracy.

Leadership
The president of GMF is Heather Conley, who joined in 2021 following the departure of Karen Donfried, who left the role she had had since 2014 to join the State Department as Assistant Secretary of State for Europe in the Biden administration.

Past presidents of GMF include Benjamin H. Read (1973–1977), Robert Gerald Livingston (1977–1981), Frank E. Loy (1981–1995), and Craig Kennedy (1996–2014).

History

Foundation
GMF was founded as a permanent memorial to Marshall Plan assistance through a grant from the West German government. It was founded by Guido Goldman, who was the director of Harvard's West European Studies program in the early 1970s. Goldman, an American whose family had fled Germany in 1940, lobbied the West German government, particularly Finance Minister Alex Möller for an endowment to promote European and U.S. relations on the 25th anniversary of Marshall Plan aid.  Working with a planning group that was to constitute the fund's initial board of trustees – including physicist Harvey Brooks, diplomat Robert Ellsworth, journalist Max Franke, economist Richard N. Cooper, and educator Howard Swearer – Goldman eventually received an agreement to support an independent institution in 1971.

German Chancellor Willy Brandt, announced the creation of GMF in a speech on June 5, 1972, at Harvard, saying that it would help increase U.S.–European cooperation and mutual understanding. Brandt wrote four years later:

Other charter members of the board of trustees included economist Carl Kaysen, judge Arlin Adams, and businessman Donald M. Kendall. The first president, selected in 1973, was Benjamin H. Read, who was later to become U.S. Under Secretary of State for Management.

Early days (1972–1989)

In the 1970s and 1980s, GMF dispersed grants in accordance with its mission, including to academic researchers and to the Public Broadcasting Service and National Public Radio. It also provided the initial funding for the Institute for International Economics, now the Peterson Institute for International Economics. By 1977, the organization had spent more than $7 million on nearly 100 projects involving the United States, West Germany, France, Britain, Italy, Sweden, Belgium, Denmark, the Netherlands, Norway, Switzerland, Japan and Canada. Academic Michael Naumann has said that GMF was one of the first think tanks to focus on the importance of soft power at a time when most academic focus was on military issues.

In addition to grants, GMF also began a U.S.-Europe parliamentary exchange program and the Marshall Memorial Fellowship, which has since funded the exchange of over 3000 young leaders across the Atlantic. 1977 was also the first year GMF organized a parliamentary exchange between the United States and Europe, with 12 young European parliamentarians visiting the U.S. Congress in Washington.

In 1980, GMF opened its first European office in Bonn. In 1985, the West German government renewed its grant to GMF. In 1987, George Kennan gave the keynote address at a conference organized in West Berlin by GMF to commemorate the 40th anniversary of the Marshall Plan. Also in the 1980s, GMF supported programs such as a National Governors Association initiative to tackle acid rain, and began to work actively with the democracy movements of Central and Eastern Europe through the funding of small grants.

GMF expansion (1989–present)
After the Berlin Wall fell in 1989, GMF was among the first U.S. organizations to establish a presence in what had been East Berlin, in 1990. It moved its Bonn operations to Berlin in 1992. In 2006, GMF acquired its current headquarters in Washington, D.C., a building that until 1963 had housed the West German chancery, and that had hosted such figures as John F. Kennedy, Konrad Adenauer, Lyndon B. Johnson, and George C. Marshall. German Chancellor Angela Merkel dedicated the new building.

GMF rapidly expanded its work in Central and Eastern Europe and played an instrumental role during the 1990s in assisting with the transitions to democracy in this region. In the 2000s, GMF established an office in Bratislava for activities in Central and Eastern Europe, the Balkan Trust for Democracy in Belgrade, the Black Sea Trust in Bucharest, and an office in Warsaw. In 2001, GMF established a center in Brussels and an office in Paris.

GMF also began to expand its public policy activities. In 2002, GMF conducted its first survey, along with the Chicago Council on Global Affairs. The next year, it was renamed Transatlantic Trends, and became an annual indicator of public opinion on both sides of the Atlantic. GMF established its Transatlantic Fellows program to enable permanent resident expertise on global public policy issues. It also founded the Transatlantic Academy for visiting scholars, and initiated the Transatlantic Take commentary series. GMF's exchange programs also expanded with the addition of American Marshall Memorial Fellows, the initiation of the Manfred Worner Seminar for defense specialists, and the establishment of the Congress-Bundestag Forum.

By the mid-2000s, GMF established itself as a major convener on transatlantic issues. In 2004, GMF organized a major conference in Istanbul in the run-up to the NATO Summit, which led to the opening of an office in Ankara. In 2005, GMF hosted President George W. Bush in Brussels, where he delivered the first foreign speech of his second term. The next year, 2006, saw the first Brussels Forum, now the preeminent conference on transatlantic relations. GMF's convening continued to grow every year and began hosting expert dialogues on Turkey, China, India, and the Mediterranean, as well as events alongside international climate change summits in Copenhagen and Cancun. In 2012, GMF added a second annual event, The Atlantic Dialogues, in Morocco. Speakers at GMF events have included John Kerry, Robert Gates, Madeleine Albright, Recep Tayyip Erdogan, Catherine Ashton, Condoleezza Rice, Wolfgang Schauble, Gordon Brown, and Zbigniew Brzezinski, among many other European and U.S. heads of state and government, cabinet ministers, and legislators.

Major conferences

Brussels Forum

Brussels Forum is an annual meeting of influential U.S., European, and global political, corporate, and intellectual leaders in Brussels. Participants include heads of state and government, senior officials from the European Union institutions and the member states, U.S. cabinet officials, congressional representatives, parliamentarians, academics, and media.

Atlantic Dialogues
The Atlantic Dialogues is an annual event in Morocco involving around 300 high-level public- and private-sector leaders from around the Atlantic Basin, including Africa and Latin America. Topics of discussion include cross-regional issues ranging from security to economics, migration to energy.

Stockholm China Forum
Stockholm China Forum is a bi-annual, trilateral conference of European, U.S. and Chinese officials, academics, business leaders and other attendees. The forum has run since 2007, when it was established to create an informal, off-the-record space to foster transatlantic cooperation on China policy, and trilateral cooperation on areas of agreement and mutual interest.

Leadership programs 
 Marshall Memorial Fellowship
 Transatlantic Inclusion Leadership Network
 Manfred Wörner Seminar
 The Policy Designers Network (PDN)
 Young Strategists Forum

References

External links 

 

1972 establishments in Washington, D.C.
Dupont Circle
Foreign policy and strategy think tanks
German-American culture in Washington, D.C.
Germany–United States relations
Political and economic think tanks in the United States
Think tanks based in Washington, D.C.
Think tanks established in 1972
United States–European relations
Non-profit organizations based in Washington, D.C.
501(c)(3) organizations